Union College is a private Seventh-day Adventist college in Lincoln, Nebraska. Founded in 1891, it is owned and operated by the Mid-American Union Conference of the Seventh-day Adventist Church. It is accredited by the Adventist Accrediting Association (AAA) and the Higher Learning Commission. The college is home to the Center for Interfaith Studies and Culture. It is a part of the Seventh-day Adventist education system, the world's second largest Christian school system.

History
L. A. Hoopes and a committee of church leaders, including influential Adventist scholar and administrator W. W. Prescott, came to Lincoln, Nebraska in search of land to establish a college in the Mid-West. In September 1891, Union College opened its doors to students with Prescott serving as its first president. The present-day community of College View grew around the college campus. During the 1920s, the college experienced a difficult period due to the shrinking enrollment and budget deficits. In 1939, former Mayor of Lincoln Don Lathrop Love donated money for the college to build an industrial building and established a life annuity with the college a year later. The 1970s saw major expansion of the college, including the construction of the iconic 100-foot clock tower, Everett Dick Administration Building, the college's lab school George Stone School and College View Church. Founded on barren landscape, the college is the location of the Joshua C. Turner Arboretum, a site of the Nebraska Statewide Arboretum, hosting over 100 species of plants.

The college previously owned the radio station KUCV from its 1974 sign-on until 1989, now the flagship station of NET Radio; the call-sign letters are named after the college.

In athletics, Union College plays as the Warriors and fields a limited number of sports, but is not a member of a major colliege sports associatation, such as the NCAA or NAIA, or smaller Christian athletic associations, existing as an independent school. As such, their teams tend to play against bible colleges, community colleges, and JV teams. The college also host two tournaments each year (one for basketball and one for volleyball) for Seventh-day Adventist high school teams.

Presidents
Union College's presidents have included:

W. W. Prescott (1891–1893)
J. W. Loughhead (1893–1896)
E. B. Miller (1896–1897)
N. W. Kauble (1897–1898)
W. T. Bland (1898–1901)
L. A. Hoopes (1901–1904)
C. C. Lewis (1904–1910)
Frederick Griggs (1910–1914)
H. A. Morrison (1914–1922)
O. M. John (1922–1924)
W. W. Prescott (1924–1925)
Leo Thiel (1925–1928)
P. L. Thompson (1928–1931)
M. L. Andreasen (1931–1938)
A. H. Rulkoetter (1938–1942)
E. E. Cossentine (1942–1946)
R. W. Woods (1946–1950)
H. C. Hartman (1950–1957)
D. J. Bieber (1957–1964)
R. W. Fowler (1964–1970)
R. H. Brown (1970–1973)
M. O. Manley (1973–1980)
Dean L. Hubbard (1980–1984)
Benjamin R. Wygal (1985–1985)
John Wagner (1986–1991)
John Kerbs (1991–1998)
David C. Smith (1998–2011)
John Wagner (2011–2014)
Vinita Sauder (2014–present)

Academics
The college is organized into eight divisions:
 Business and Computer Science
 Emergency Management and Exercise Science
 Fine Arts
 Human Development
 Humanities
 Nursing
 Religion
 Science & Math

In addition, the college offers a Master of Physician Assistant Studies program.

Notable people

Alumni

Wayne Hooper, gospel music composer
T. R. M. Howard
Rukebai K. Inabo, Senator of Palau
Milton E. Kern, educator
Sandra Pierantozzi, former Vice President of Palau
Chester Wickwire, chaplain, civil rights and peace activist

Faculty
Jonathan M. Butler, historian
Frank Lewis Marsh, biologist, educator
John G. Matteson, minister who brought the Seventh-day Adventist Church to Denmark
C. Mervyn Maxwell, professor of church history and noted figure in the Historic Adventism movement and author of Tell It to the World
Mike Mennard, recording artist, current literature and communications lecturer

See also

 List of Seventh-day Adventist colleges and universities
 Seventh-day Adventist education
 Seventh-day Adventist Church
 Seventh-day Adventist theology
 History of the Seventh-day Adventist Church

References

External links

 
Liberal arts colleges in Nebraska
Educational institutions established in 1891
Universities and colleges affiliated with the Seventh-day Adventist Church
Education in Lincoln, Nebraska
Clock towers in Nebraska
Buildings and structures in Lincoln, Nebraska
1891 establishments in Nebraska
Private universities and colleges in Nebraska